Bendekere is a village in Hassan district in Karnataka state, India. It is situated 5km away from sub-district headquarter Arsikere and 50km away from district headquarter Hassan.

References

Villages in Hassan district